Eustomias trewavasae, the deepsea dragonfish, is a small abyssal barbeled dragonfish of the family Stomiidae, found worldwide in tropical and subtropical oceans at depths down to 1,500 m. Its length is up to  TL.

Named in honor of Ethelwynn Trewavas (1900-1993), British Museum (Natural History), for her work on the stomiid fishes of the Dana expeditions.

References

 
 Tony Ayling & Geoffrey Cox, Collins Guide to the Sea Fishes of New Zealand,  (William Collins Publishers Ltd, Auckland, New Zealand 1982) 

Stomiidae
Taxa named by John Roxborough Norman
Fish described in 1930